The 1977–78 Connecticut Huskies men's basketball team represented the University of Connecticut in the 1977–78 collegiate men's basketball season. The Huskies completed the season with an 11–15 overall record. The Huskies were an NCAA Division I Independent school for men's basketball this year. The Huskies played their home games at Hugh S. Greer Field House in Storrs, Connecticut and the Hartford Civic Center in Hartford, Connecticut, and were led by first-year head coach Dom Perno.

Schedule 

|-
!colspan=12 style=""| Regular Season

Schedule Source:

References 

UConn Huskies men's basketball seasons
Connecticut
1977 in sports in Connecticut
1978 in sports in Connecticut